Graham Watson (born 11 September 1970) is a Scottish former footballer, who played for Aberdeen, Clyde, Livingston and Forfar Athletic.

Whilst at Aberdeen he played in the 1990 Scottish Cup Final and scored one of the penalties in the shootout as Aberdeen defeated Celtic.

References

1970 births
Living people
Sportspeople from St Andrews
Scottish footballers
Association football defenders
Aberdeen F.C. players
Clyde F.C. players
Livingston F.C. players
Forfar Athletic F.C. players
Scottish Football League players
Footballers from Fife